Sariaya, officially the Municipality of Sariaya,  is a 1st class municipality in the province of Quezon, Philippines. According to the 2020 census, it has a population of 161,868 people.

As the only Mount Banahaw town in both Quezon and Laguna Provinces that has a sea coast, the town is famous for its pristine beach resorts and nature-trekking activities that lead adventurous hikers to the peak of mythical Mount Banahaw. With more than a hundred of cultural properties and ancestral houses mostly built in Art Deco architecture within the municipality, Sariaya is considered as the Heritage Town of Quezon and the Art Deco Capital of Southern Luzon. This heritage town has been branded by various cultural experts as a 'cultural gem worthy of a UNESCO designation.' The local government of the municipality with the National Commission for Culture and the Arts of the Philippines were designated to work for the heritage town's inclusion in the UNESCO World Heritage List.

With the 2020 census population of almost reaching 161,000, Sariaya is the most populous municipality in the province of Quezon and the 19th most populous municipality in the Philippines. Cityhood might be coming to Sariaya in a matter of years.

Etymology
The origin of the word Sariaya was allegedly came from the word Sadyaya — one of the town's numerous rivers, but words of the great ancestors and legends have it that it was named after Saria, an supposedly 'illiterate' (according to the Spanish) woman who encountered the first Spaniards in the town who were asking the name of the settlement. Saria can't understand the question as it was in Spanish, which was foreign and unknown to everyone in the area during that time. She was thus branded as illiterate by the Spanish despite being highly educated through Tagalog traditional knowledge. The woman gave her name as answer to the Spanish, assuming that they were asking her name. The Spaniards wrote "Saria" on their notebooks as the name of the settlement. And while the Spaniards were talking with each other, the natives heard them utter the words "Saria-ya". Hence, the words traveled from mouth to mouth and became a common saying until the two words were combined.

Geography
The municipality is bordered by Tayabas City on north-east side, the city of Lucena on its southeast, the municipality of Candelaria on its west, and the town of San Juan in Batangas on its south-west. Mount Banahaw flanks it on the north and Tayabas Bay on the south side.

Barangays
Sariaya has a total land area of 24,530 hectares and composed of 43 barangays. Six barangays are urban barangays located at the Poblacion, one barangay is classified as sub-urban and six barangays are coastal barangays.

Hereunder is the list of Barangays in Municipality of Sariaya and its land area:

Topography
Sariaya is situated on a flat land except for a portion on the north occupying a part of the foot of Mount Banahaw. The municipality has the highest point of elevation on 3,800 feet above sea level at Barangays Concepcion Banahaw and Sampaloc Bogon.

Climate

Sariaya falls under Type III of the PAGASA's climatic classification system this is because it is situated on the southern portion of the province's mountain ranges characterized by seasons not very pronounced, relatively dry from December to April and wet during the rest of the year. The maximum rain periods are not very pronounced with the short dry season lasting from two to four months.

Demographics

According to the 2020 census of population, Sariaya has a total population of 161,868 people making the second most populous area in Quezon after the City of Lucena.
Barangay Santo Cristo is the most populous area in Sariaya with a total population of 9,007 people according to the 2020 census, The Poblacion ranks second and Concepcion Palasan placed in the third rank.

Economy

Commerce
The trade and commerce in Sariaya is heavily concentrated at General Luna Street (Maharlika Highway), which is the town's central business district where majority of the town's commercial establishments are situated such as retail, supermarkets, banks, drugstores, bakeries, merchandising, grocery, hardware, fastfood chains, shopping center, convenience stores and others.

Income
Agriculture is one of the major sources of income in Sariaya. According to the 2016 Competitiveness Index of the National Competitiveness Council or NCC, the municipality belongs to the Top 50 most competitive municipalities in the Philippines. According to the annual Audit Report of Commission on Audit (COA), Sariaya is also one of Quezon's top grossing municipalities when factoring annual income.
 
Here's the list of the total annual income, assets, expenses and equity of Sariaya since 2008:

Culture
 Agawan Festival

Celebrated every 15th day of May, this religious festivity pays tribute to San Isidro Labrador, the patron saint of farmers. This much-anticipated feast has close affinity with the 'Pahiyas Festival' of Lucban, Quezon. Pliant bamboo treetops and trellises (bagakay) weighed down by succulent fruits, native candies, rice cakes, and colorful rice krispies called "kiping" are deliberately pulled down on the streets by noisy merrymakers right after the afternoon procession. Festival revelers from the town's barangays, neighboring towns, and other provinces would then scramble to gather as many treats as they can snatch and carry, hence the term "Agawan."

 Town Fiesta

On September 14, pious devotees from far and wide pay homage to the miraculous image of the Santo Cristo de Burgos during the Feast of the Exaltation of the Cross. The Catholic feast is a day-long veneration of the replica of the Crucified Christ at the ancient Cathedral of Burgos, Spain long believed to be a gift of King Philip V of Spain in 1703 to the people of Lumangbayan in Sariaya. People from far-flung barangays flock to the Poblacion to attend the packed fiesta Masses. They also sell their farm products and handicrafts in the public market as they eagerly sample the gaudily-decorated and crowded venue for the annual "perya" (fiesta fair) for thrilling rides, occasional circus performances, and shows featuring human mutants, trained animals performing tricks, vendors peddling herbal medicines, and "peryantes," those hardy and itinerant peddlers of cheap clothing, toys, and kitchen utensils. The town's basketball tournament also holds its cherished championship game on the eve of this much-awaited day. Sometimes there are hired stage performances at the town plaza that feature some of the nation's stage, television and film celebrities as well as musical stars.
.......

Government

Elected officials

Elected officials for the 2019–2022 term are:

Infrastructure

Transportation

Sariaya is traversed by the Maharlika Highway (N1), which passes through the town proper as the congested General Luna Street, and the newer Quezon Eco-Tourism Road (N422) which passes through the municipality's coastal areas. New highways will be South Luzon Expressway (SLEX) Toll Road 4, which will have one exit west of town proper, and the Sariaya Bypass Road, which is being built to decongest Maharlika Highway through the town center.

Buses between Manila, Lucena, and Bicol stop at Sariaya town proper, and jeepneys provide short-distance transportation to nearby towns. Tricycles are used to travel between barangays.

Communication
Sariaya is served by landline and mobile phone companies like the General Telephone System, Inc. (GTSi) and Digitel Telecommunications (PLDT-Digitel) as the main telecommunication services providers in the municipality. Major mobile phone providers in the area includes Globe Telecom, Smart Communications, and Dito Telecommunity. Also, Sariaya has a cable provider which is the Sariaya Cable Network.

Tourism

Saint Francis of Assisi Parish Church
 
Saint Francis of Assisi Parish Church is a stone church built in 1748, located at Barangay Poblacion II. Records tell that the present church is the fifth one erected by the Spanish Franciscan Friars in the history of Sariaya. In 1938, a historical marker bearing a brief history of the church was installed on its facade by the National Research and Markers Committee, precursor of the National Historical Commission of the Philippines.

Heritage houses
 
 

On May 14, 2008, the National Historical Institute (NHI) unveiled markers of heritage houses for the three ancient yet still stately mansions at the heart of Sariaya town. These venerable houses are best viewed from the south, as they are silhouetted against the majestic and mystical Mount Banahaw, Quezon's long-dormant volcano. Cultural recognition was bestowed on three ancestral houses, namely:  The Enriquez-Gala mansion, owned by former Tayabas (now Quezon) Gov. Natalio Enriquez and Susana Gala; the Gala-Rodriguez house of Dr. Isidro Rodriguez and Gregoria Gala, and the house of Catalino and Luisa Rodriguez also known as Villa Sariaya.

Tumbaga Church ruins

Remains of an early 18th-century stone church and former town site of Sariaya, located at Barangay Tumbaga I. The settlement was inaugurated in 1703 with Father Lucas Fernandez as first parish priest and Francisco Argente as Presidente del Pueblo. The church, which measured 500 square meters, served a recorded population of 3000 parishioners. Two events led to the abandonment of the town site: the earthquake of 1743 which consequently destroyed the church's bell tower, and the Moro raids which left the town site in ruins after being razed by fire. The venerated image of Santo Cristo de Burgos is said to have been enshrined in the church before it was transferred to its present shrine in the San Francisco Church in the present-day town proper of Sariaya. The unscathed image was said have been retrieved from the burnt church after the Muslim raider attack. The church is believed to be the fourth church structure built by the Spanish Franciscan Friars in Sariaya.

Sariaya Park

This multi-purpose park is a perfect place for recreational activities because of its pleasant and calm ambiance where kids can play at the park's playground, located at the heart of the town in front of Sariaya Church and the Town Hall at the left side. Sariaya Park is also the location where Sariaya Sports Complex is situated and usually used as the venue of different events and Basketball Leagues in the town.

Resorts

Sariaya is the first town in the western part of the province with a sea coast. The municipality hosts numerous beach resorts and pool resorts which offers pristine beach and recreational activities.

Pool Resorts

 Villa Leandro Resort
 Lucky D Resort
 Primavera Resort
 Lynelle's Lagoon Resort
 Ada's Resort and Spa
 BLT Farmville Resort
 Villa Trenta / Eddy WoW Pool Farm Resort
 Floreddy's Farm Resort

Beach Resorts with Boat Rides to Coral Reefs

 Triple J Beach Resort (Barangay Guis-Guis Talon)
 M.Y. Beach Resort (Barangay Guis-Guis Talon)

Healthcare

There are two private hospitals in Sariaya, with a dependable and well-staffed health center providing free medical and preventive services for residents of the forty-three barangays of the municipality.
Greg Hospital, located at General Luna St., Barangay Poblacion 1
Soler General Hospital, located at Mabini St., Barangay Poblacion 6

Education

Notable personalities

 Leo Austria — former professional basketball player and the head coach of San Miguel Beermen of the Philippine Basketball Association.
 Maximo Rodriguez — twice Sariaya Municipal President (Mayor) in 1906–1907 and 1914-1916 and twice Tayabas (Quezon) Provincial Governor in 1916–1922 and 1933–1937.  He also became the principal sponsor of former Philippine president Manuel L. Quezon and Aurora Aragon at their Hong Kong wedding and he was also the instrument in the peaceful surrender of the dreaded Kapitan Kulas and became the Chairman-General Manager of the National Coconut Corporation (NACOCO), the fore runner of the Philippine Coconut Authority. He established the Maximo Rodriguez Solid Laboratory in Sariaya.
 Braulio de Villa — twice Sariaya Town Gobernadorcillo (Mayor) in 1889 and 1892 to 1894, and later became the Provincial Governor of Batangas, his home province.
 Natalio Enriquez – Sariaya Municipal President (Mayor) from 1938 to 1940 and later became the Provincial Governor of Tayabas (Quezon Province) from 1941 to 1945.
 Jovencio de Villa – became the Provincial Governor of Tayabas Province (Quezon Province) during the Japanese Occupation period.
 Roberto P. Racelis – was elected as Provincial Vice Governor of Quezon Province thrice but became Governor (by Operation of Law) from August 8, 1995, to July 25, 1996, and from April 4, 1998, to June 30, 1998.
 Don John L. Montalbo – is known for discovering the "Talon sa Bahanaw" on August 24, 1996.

Sister cities
Sariaya has a sister city relationship with the foreign community of:

 Santa Clarita, California, United States, since 2003

References

External links

Sariaya Profile at PhilAtlas.com
[ Philippine Standard Geographic Code]

Local Governance Performance Management System
CSTC - College of Sciences, Technology and Communication, Inc. (Sariaya)

Municipalities of Quezon